Cadea is a genus of amphisbaenians, commonly known as  Cuban keel-headed worm lizards. Two species are placed in this genus. Both species are endemic to Cuba.

Species

Cadea blanoides (Stejneger, 1916) - spotted amphisbaena
Cadea palirostrata (Dickerson, 1916) - sharp-nosed amphisbaena, Dickerson's worm lizard, Cuban sharp-nosed amphisbaena

References

Further reading
Gans C (2005). "Checklist and Bibliography of the Amphisbaenia of the World". Bulletin of the American Museum of Natural History (289): 1–130.

External links

 
Lizard genera
Taxa named by John Edward Gray